Kach Gandava or Kachi is a low-lying flat region in Balochistan, Pakistan separating the Bugti hills from those of Kalat. Until the end of the 15th century the district had been a dependency of Sindh Around 1500 it was taken by Shah Beg of the Arghun Dynasty from Samma Dynasty of Sultan Of Sindh and so came under the control of Kandahar.Soon the territory was conquered by the Kalhoras Amirs of Sindh, they were displaced by the Nadir Shah of Persia and made it the part of Kalat Khanate in 1740. Kachhi was notified as a district in February 1965. At that time Naseerabad, Jhal Magsi and Jafarabad districts were included, these were separated in 1987.
It is driven, like a wedge, into the frontier mountain system and extends for 150 miles from Jacobabad to Sibi, with nearly as great a breadth at its base on the Sindh frontier. The soil is fertile wherever it can be irrigated by the floods brought down from the surrounding hills; but much of the central portion is sandy waste. It is traversed by the North-Western railway.

References 

Geography of Balochistan, Pakistan